Ibacus alticrenatus is a species of slipper lobster that lives in the waters of Australia and New Zealand.

Description
Ibacus alticrenatus is one of the smaller species of Ibacus. There are typically 8, but occasionally 7 or 9, teeth along either edge of the carapace, behind the cervical incision.

Distribution
Around Australia, I. alticrenatus is found from the North West Cape in Western Australia, around the country's south coast, to 20° south in northern Queensland. Although I. brucei has also been recorded from the Kermadec Islands and the West Norfolk Ridge, I. alticrenatus is the only slipper lobster to occur around the main islands of New Zealand.

Life cycle
The eggs are incubated on the female's pleopods for 3–4 months before hatching; this occurs from April to October, with rates peaking in July. The succeeding moult is accompanied by a metamorphosis into the juveniles form (known as the "puerulus" or "nisto" stage), which much more closely resembles the adult form. There is a final "post-puerulus" stage before the animal reaches adulthood.

Taxonomy
Ibacus alticrenatus was first described in 1888 by Charles Spence Bate. Four syntypes are held in the Natural History Museum in London.

Common names for the species include "deep water bug" (Australia), "sandy bug" (Australia), "prawn killer" (New Zealand) and "velvet fan lobster", the last being the name preferred by the Food and Agriculture Organization.

Ecology and conservation

The highest total landing in New Zealand for any fishing season was 49.12 t in 1992–1993. I. alticrenatus was added to New Zealand's Quota Management System on October 1, 2007, and the total allowable catch was set to 37.4 t. The majority of the catch is taken in the area to the north of North Island. Because of its wide range, Ibacus alticrenatus is listed as Least Concern on the IUCN Red List.

References

External links

Achelata
Edible crustaceans
Marine crustaceans of New Zealand
Crustaceans of Australia
Crustaceans described in 1888